Presidential transition of Luiz Inácio Lula da Silva may refer to:
 First presidential transition of Luiz Inácio Lula da Silva (2002–2003)
 Second presidential transition of Luiz Inácio Lula da Silva (2022–2023)